Seisdon is a hundred in the county of Staffordshire, England, located in the south-west of that county. It is named after Seisdon, a locality in the parish of Trysull and Seisdon.

Etymology
The name appears to mean "hill of the Saxons", deriving from the Anglo-Saxon words Seis meaning Saxon and Dun meaning hill. The first element may alternatively be a personal name. A  large  number  of  Hundred names  refer  to  hills  or  mounds. Some  of  these  at  least  are  very  conspicuous  hills,  which  afford  a commanding  view  of  the  countryside  for miles  around.  It seems likely  that  such  sites  were  chosen  as  being'  remote,  and  where interference  was  most  easily  avoided. The hundred and the hamlet may be named from the hill that was the meeting place of the hundred, instead of the hundred being named after the hamlet.

History
The origin of the hundred dates from the division of his kingdom by King Alfred the Great into counties, hundreds and tithings. From the beginning, Staffordshire was divided into the hundreds of Seisdon, Pirehill, Totmonslow, Cuttleston and Seisdon.
Each hundred was formed to support a military unit.

Seisdon Hundred is the smallest in area of the five hundreds of Staffordshire, but it has a relatively high population density and agricultural productivity. It formed the south-western portion of the county, bounded on the west by Shropshire, on the south by Worcestershire, on the east by Offlow Hundred, and on the north by Cuttleston Hundred. The old Forest of Brewood formed the boundary of Seisdon and Cuttleston.

The Hundred contained Wolverhampton, the largest town of the county, and many populous villages, which were constituted into 15 parishes, part of 5 others and 2 extra-parochial areas. The extensive parish of Wolverhampton contained several townships, only some of which were in Seisdon Hundred.

Seison Hundred was divided into North and South Divisions. each with their own High Constable. This arrangement dates back to 17th century, at least.

One parish, Tettenhall, was divided between the two Divisions of Seisdon. The parish was subdivided into 4 Prebends  Two of these, Pendeford and Wrottesley, belonged to Seisdon South and the rest of the parish was in Seisdon North.

The town of Dudley with its suburbs formed a detached portion of the county of Worcestershire. However, Dudley Castle, a ruined castle, with the limestone hill on which it stands, was an extra-parochial area in Seisdon South. It had  no inhabitants.

Clent (including Broome and Rowley Regis) were seized by the Sheriff of Staffordshire (called Aevic) in 1016, which resulted in them becoming
part of Staffordshire  Although they were now in Staffordshire, in 19th century Broome, Clent, and Rowley Regis were the only parishes in Staffordshire not included in the Diocese of Lichfield, as they belonged to that of Worcester.
All three parishes were included in Seisdon Hundred, but the parishes of Clent and Broome formed a detached part of Staffordshire surrounded by Worcestershire and a detached part of Shropshire. They left Seisdon Hundred in 1844 as they were transferred to Worcestershire.

Seisdon contained following local government units:
 
 

Seisdon North

Seisdon South

The Hundred presented a great diversity of soil and scenery. It was rich in coal, ironstone, lime, and freestone, and renowned for its extensive mines and iron works, and for the manufacture of a great variety of articles in iron, steel, and other metals.

Notes

Hundreds of Staffordshire
South Staffordshire District